Springfield is a historic home located at Coatesville, Hanover County, Virginia. It was built about 1820, and is a two-story, Federal-style brick residence with a central passage-single pile plan. It measures 48 feet by 20 feet, and is situated on an English basement with two interior end chimneys, a gable roof, and a frame gable-roofed porch.  Also on the property are contributing kitchen and meat house.

It was listed on the National Register of Historic Places in 1994.

References

Houses on the National Register of Historic Places in Virginia
Federal architecture in Virginia
Houses completed in 1820
Houses in Hanover County, Virginia
National Register of Historic Places in Hanover County, Virginia